The 1956–57 WHL season was the fifth season of the Western Hockey League. The Brandon Regals were the President's Cup champions as they beat the New Westminster Royals in four games in the final series.

Final Standings 

bold - qualified for playoffs

Playoffs 
The Brandon Regals win the President's Cup 4 games to 0.

References 

Western Hockey League (1952–1974) seasons
1956–57 in American ice hockey by league
1956–57 in Canadian ice hockey by league